This is a list of public art in LaPorte County, Indiana.

This list applies only to works of public art accessible in an outdoor public space. For example, this does not include artwork visible inside a museum.  

Most of the works mentioned are sculptures. When this is not the case (i.e. sound installation, for example) it is stated next to the title.

LaPorte

Michigan City

Notes

Tourist attractions in LaPorte County, Indiana
LaPorte County